Warm Chris is the fourth studio album by the New Zealand independent folk artist, Aldous Harding, released on March 25, 2022 by 4AD. The album's release was preceded by two singles, "Lawn" and "Fever".

Critical reception
In a review for Pitchfork, Sophie Kemp gave the album a positive review, praising it as showcasing "some of Harding's best songwriting yet".

Track listing

Personnel 
 Ali Chant – mixing, vocals
 Aldous Harding – bell, composer, acoustic guitar, humming, piano, electric piano, vocals
 Gavin Fitzjohn – flugelhorn, horn, baritone saxophone
 H. Hawkline – banjo, bass, design, Fender Rhodes, guitar, electric guitar, layout, Hammond organ, photography, vocals
 Hopey Parish – vocals
 Jason Mitchell – mastering
 Jason Williamson – vocals
 Joe Jones – engineer
 John Parish – bass, drums, Fender Rhodes, electric guitar, humming, keyboards, mixing, Hammond organ, percussion, producer, shaker, slide guitar, tambourine, vocals
 Seb Rochford – drums
 Steve Prescott – assistant photographer

Charts

Year-end charts

References 

2022 albums
Aldous Harding albums
4AD albums
Albums produced by John Parish